The 1900 United States presidential election in Virginia took place on November 6, 1900, as part of the 1900 United States presidential election. Voters chose 12 representatives, or electors to the Electoral College, who voted for president and vice president.

Virginia voted for the Democratic candidate, former U.S. Representative William J. Bryan over the Republican candidate, incumbent President William McKinley. Bryan won the state by a margin of 11.47%.

McKinley is the most recent Republican to win two terms in the White House without carrying Virginia either time.

Results

Results by county

Notes

References

Virginia
1900
1900 Virginia elections